K. C. Douglas (November 21, 1913 – October 18, 1975) was an American rural blues singer and guitarist.  His given names were initials only.

Career
Born in Sharon, Mississippi, Douglas moved to Vallejo, California in 1945 to work in the naval shipyards, and by 1947 was playing on the San Francisco/Oakland blues scene. Douglas was influenced by Tommy Johnson, who he had worked with in the Jackson, Mississippi area in the early 1940s, and whose "Canned Heat Blues" he adapted on his albums, A Dead Beat Guitar and the Mississippi Blues and Big Road Blues.

The K. C. Douglas Trio's first recording was "Mercury Boogie" (later renamed "Mercury Blues"), in 1948. The other credited musicians were Sidney Maiden (harmonica), Ford Chaney (second guitar), and Otis Cherry (drums). The song has been covered by Steve Miller, David Lindley, Ry Cooder and Dwight Yoakam, and a 1992 version by Alan Jackson was a number two hit on the US country chart. Meat Loaf also covered the song as a bonus hidden track that appears on his 2003 album Couldn't Have Said It Better. The Ford Motor Company purchased rights to the song and used it in a TV commercial.

In the early 1960s Douglas recorded for Chris Strachwitz, mostly released on Strachwitz's Arhoolie Records and the Prestige Bluesville label. In 1961, Douglas played guitar on Sidney Maiden's album, Trouble An' Blues, thus reuniting a partnership that had started in the 1940s.

Douglas played at the San Francisco Blues Festival in 1973 and 1974. He formed a quartet that performed in the East Bay/Modesto/Stockton area.

Douglas died of a heart attack in Berkeley, California in October 1975, and was buried in the Pleasant Green Cemetery in Sharon, Mississippi.

Influence
While in his thirties and working at a garage, Douglas taught blues guitar to Steve Wold, now performing as Seasick Steve, the grandson of his employer.

Selected discography

Singles

Note: the reverse of "Mercury Boogie" was by Sidney Maiden.

Albums

References

External links

K.C. Douglas biography at Music.msn.com
[ AllMusic]
Illustrated K.C. Douglas discography

1913 births
1975 deaths
People from Madison County, Mississippi
Blues musicians from Mississippi
American blues guitarists
American male guitarists
American blues singers
Singers from California
20th-century American singers
20th-century American guitarists
Guitarists from California
Guitarists from Mississippi
20th-century American male musicians